Bullarto railway station is a railway station on the Daylesford line, in Bullarto, Victoria, Australia. The station was opened on Wednesday, 17 March 1880, and closed on Monday, 3 July 1978.

By 1969, the platform was 74m in length, and by 1975, Bullarto was working under no-one-in-charge conditions.

At 747m above sea level, it was the second highest station on the Victorian Railways.

Re-opening
The section of line between Musk and Bullarto was reopened on 17 March 1997.
Bullarto Station is the current terminus of Daylesford Spa Country Railway rail motor tourist services. The station platform and portable building have now been restored and a run around loop provided.

References

Victoria (Australia) tourist railway stations